The , signed as Route 11, is one of the tolled routes of the Shuto Expressway system serving the Greater Tokyo Area. Route 11 runs from Shibaura Junction (with the Haneda Route) in Minato-ku and runs for 3.9 km through the Rainbow Bridge. Route 11 ends at the Ariake Junction connecting with the Bayshore Route in Kōtō-ku.

Originally, the route number was "12" in urban planning.

Route description
It runs through Rainbow Bridge which is renowned for its scenery, so sometimes, especially on holidays, a high concentration of cars on the bridge causes traffic congestion.

History
The entirety of the Daiba Route was opened to traffic on 26 August 1993. Instead of being opened in phases, like many of the other routes in the Shuto Expressway network.

Exit list

Appearances in media
 Wangan Midnight, a manga and anime series based on street racing on the Wangan.
 Wangan Midnight Maximum Tune, an arcade racing game taking place on the Wangan.
 Shutokō Battle (首都高, abbreviation for "Shuto Expressway") is a Genki game based on Wangan racing
 Shutokō Battle series, an arcade Wangan racing game
 In Cars 2, a portion of the Tokyo race goes over the Rainbow Bridge.

See also

References

External links

 首都高速道路株式会社

Expressways in Japan
1993 establishments in Japan
Roads in Tokyo